Pale Folklore is the debut studio album by American metal band Agalloch. The album was released on June 6, 1999 by The End Records. It featured an eclectic mix of acoustic folk reminiscent of Scandinavian bands such as Ulver; doom and black metal-esque riffs; growled, clean, whispered, and shrieked vocals; and a production style and atmosphere that borrowed heavily from black metal. The lyrical themes focused mainly on depression, nature, folklore and the supernatural. It featured the roots of a post-rock influence which was greatly expanded on with Agalloch's second studio album, The Mantle.

Track listing

Personnel
Agalloch
Don Anderson – guitar
John Haughm – vocals, guitar, drums
Jason William Walton – bass
Shane Breyer – keyboards

Additional
Produced by Ronn Chick, John Haughm and Shane Breyer
Engineered by Ronn Chick
Artwork by Dennis Gerasimenko and Sergey Makhotkin
Band photography by Aaron Sholes

References

1999 debut albums
Agalloch albums
The End Records albums
Profound Lore Records albums